Sergey Sytin (Ukr. Sergiy Valeriyovich Sitіn; born July 19, 1982 in Avdiivka, USSR) is a Ukrainian futsal player. He plays as a forward for the Moscow club Dina Moscow and played for the Ukrainian national futsal team.

Biography
Graduate of Donetsk Sports School "Shakhtar". He started his futsal career in the Donetsk club "Telecom" and "Shakhtar", with the latter he became a four-time champion and a two-time winner of the Ukrainian Cup. In the 2006-07 season he was the best scorer of the Ukrainian League and the UEFA Futsal Cup. Then Sergey moved to the Russian Superleague club "Spartak-Schelkovo." Two seasons later he left the club due to financial problems and signed a contract with Dina Moscow. With the Ukrainian national futsal team he took part in three European championships (2003, 2005, 2007) and in one World Cup (2004). Sergey is European Championship silver medalist - 2003.

Achievements
Ukrainian Futsal League Champion (4): 2002, 2004, 2005, 2006
Ukrainian Futsal Cup Winner (3): 2003, 2004, 2006
UEFA Futsal Euro-2003 Vice-Champion (1): 2003
Russian Futsal League Champion (1): 2014

External links
MFK Dina Moskva profile
AMFR profile

1982 births
Living people
People from Avdiivka
MFK Dina Moskva players
Ukrainian men's futsal players
Ukrainian expatriate futsal players
Ukrainian expatriate sportspeople in Russia
Sportspeople from Donetsk Oblast